The Croatia national under-23 football team represents Croatia in football matches for players aged 23 or under. Although it never participated at the Olympics, the team is sometimes referred to as the Croatia Olympic football team.

The team was formed for the 1993 Mediterranean Games held in France. Prior to the tournament, Croatia played two preparational friendlies against Slovenia, both ending in a 1–1 draw. These were also the first matches ever played by the Croatian team. At the tournament itself Croatia finished last in its four-teams-group, losing two, and drawing one match. In 1996 the team played a friendly against Brazil as Brazil's preparation match for the upcoming 1996 Olympics, drawing 1–1. During the 1997 Mediterranean Games held in Italy, the team again finished last in its three-teams-group, losing both matches. In 1998, it won a friendly against Romania with a 0–1 score and in 2013 it lost a friendly against the Netherlands. The team didn't play any matches from 2013 until 2022 when it met the Qatari senior team as part of their pre-2022 FIFA World Cup preparation in a friendly in Austria, winning 3–0.

Since Croatia U21 never managed to secure Croatia's participation at the Olympics through UEFA EURO U21 Championship, which serves as a qualifying system, Croatia U23 has never participated at the Olympics.

History 

Croatia's national under-23 football team was formed for the occasion of the 1993 Mediterranean Games, held in June 1993 in France. The team was led by Vlatko Marković. It played its first matches during friendlies against Slovenia, as a preparation for the Mediterranean Games. The two teams first met on 17 March 1993 in Zaprešić, Croatia, and the second time on 12 May 1993 in Maribor, Slovenia, with both matches ending in a 1–1 draw. At the tournament itself, Croatia was in the group with Tunisia, Turkey, and France. It played its first match against Tunisia, losing 0–2. Its second match against Turkey also ended in defeat, with a score of 2–3. A 3–3 draw against France was their last match in the tournament. Croatia finished last among ten teams, while Turkey won the tournament. The 1993 Mediterranean Games were at the same time the first Croatian encounter with international competitive football after its independence. The coach Marković was disappointed with the performance, blaming the "celebrities" within the team, commenting that "the first encounter with the world football shows us how low we have fallen, we're at the tail of all modern football events".

Croatia's U23 team went on to play against Brazil's U23 team in a friendly which ended in a 1–1 draw. Croatia was coached by Martin Novoselac. At the time Brazil held the champions title od the 1994 Fifa World Cup and was preparing for the 1996 Olympics in the United States.

Under the leadership of Ivo Šušak, the Croatian U23 team then competed at the 1997 Mediterranean Games, being in the group with Bosnia and Herzegovina and Spain. It lost both matches, with scores 0–1 against Bosnia and Herzegovina and 1–2 against Spain, finishing last in its group. Italy won the tournament, while Croatia finished 10th among 13 teams. The football tournament at the next Mediterranean Games was limited to players aged 21 or younger, with Croatia not participating in future Mediterranean football tournaments.

In 1998, in Bucharest, Croatia played a friendly against Romania, which at the time had one of the best young football teams. Croatia won the match with a 0–1 score. Another friendly by Croatia was played in 2013 in Pula against the Netherlands, with Croatia losing 2–3.

Croatia national under-23 football team was formed again in September 2022 to replace Bolivia senior team for a friendly match against Qatar senior team, after Bolivia canceled the match. Croatian team was coached by Robert Jarni who also led the Croatia U17 team. The match was played on 20 September 2022 in Wiener Neustadt in Austria as preparation for 2022 FIFA World Cup hosted by Qatar, with Croatia winning 0–3.

Fixtures

Coaching staff

Current coaching staff

Players

Current squad 

The following players were called up for the friendly match against Qatar A on 20 September 2022.

Competitive record

Olympic Games

Mediterranean Games

Statistics

Managers 

The following table provides a summary of the complete record of each Croatia manager's results.

Key: Pld–games played, W–games won, D–games drawn; L–games lost, %–win percentage

Last updated: Qatar A vs Croatia, 20 September 2022.

Most capped players

Top goalscorers

Most clean sheets

Record per opponent

See also 

 Croatia men's national football team
 Croatia men's national football B team
 Croatia men's national under-21 football team
 Croatia men's national under-20 football team
 Croatia men's national under-19 football team
 Croatia men's national under-18 football team
 Croatia men's national under-17 football team
 Croatia men's national under-16 football team
 Croatia men's national under-15 football team
 Croatia women's national football team
 Croatia women's national under-19 football team
 Croatia women's national under-17 football team

Footnotes

References 

 
 
 
 
 
 
 
 
 
 
 
 
 
 
 
 

Under 23
Croatia at the Summer Olympics
European national under-23 association football teams
Youth football in Croatia